The Fallout is the debut studio album by Canadian post-grunge/alternative rock band Default. Chad Kroeger, the frontman of Nickelback, contributed to the album's production and co-wrote six of its songs including its second single. With two hit singles, The Fallout is widely considered Default's best work and was their biggest commercial success, gaining platinum certification in the United States.

The song "Wasting My Time" received much airplay throughout 2001 and 2002. The second single, "Deny", was featured on the soundtrack of the popular NHL 2003 game by EA Sports and also received a great deal of air time, helping launch Default into the mainstream of Canadian rock.

A special edition of this CD, alongside a DVD, included the bonus track "Blind" and acoustic versions of the lead singles "Deny" and "Wasting My Time". An acoustic version of the final track, "Let You Down", also served as the final track to Default's sophomore effort, Elocation.

Critical reception

The Fallout received mixed reviews from music critics who were skeptical of the band's musicianship being similar to other bands of its given genre. Stephanie Dickison of PopMatters gave praise to the album's professional yet naturally sounding production and Dallas Smith's performance for giving off the right amount of energy in his notes despite being a bit jovial at times, but felt the band would face problems being similar to 3 Doors Down, Lifehouse and Nickelback, saying that "For a debut, it is excellent. But up against the other heavy-guitar, heartily vocalized bands like the aforementioned, they have their work cut out for them." Andy Hinds of AllMusic highlighted the first three tracks as standouts but found the album overall to be devoid of originality in its borrowing of grunge music, saying it "provides a non-threatening option for those who seek the stylistic affectations of grunge rock, but wish to avoid all of the substance or excitement of its first generation." David Browne, writing for Entertainment Weekly, noticed a slight difference between this and Puddle of Mudd's Come Clean apart from taking elements of grunge into their respective albums: "Default’s debut, The Fallout, is more up-tempo and burly, yet they still manage to use the word never 32 times in one cut (”Slow Me Down”). The song titles – ”Sick and Tired,” ”Wasting My Time,” ”Live a Lie” – say it all."

Track listing

Personnel
Default
Dallas Smith – lead vocals
Jeremy Hora – guitars
Dave Benedict – bass guitar
Danny Craig – drums, percussion

Additional musicians
Rick Parashar – keyboards, piano

Artwork
Benjamin Wheelock – album design
Blake Little – Photography

Production
Rick Parashar – producer, mixing 
Chad Kroeger – producer
Kip Beelman – engineer
Joe Spivak – engineer
Joey Moi – engineer, mixing
George Marino – mastering
Leonard B. Johnson - A&R

Charts and certifications

Weekly charts

Year-end charts

Certifications

Limited edition DVD 
"Wasting My Time (Video)"
"Deny (Video)"
"Deny (Live)"
"Rockumentary"

References

2001 debut albums
Default (band) albums
TVT Records albums
Albums produced by Rick Parashar
Albums recorded at Greenhouse Studios